Economic stimulus payment or economic impact payment may refer to several tax rebates, tax credits, and tax deductions from the federal government of the United States:

 Tax rebates as part of the Economic Growth and Tax Relief Reconciliation Act of 2001
 Tax rebates as part of the Economic Stimulus Act of 2008
 First coronavirus stimulus, as part of the CARES Act
 Second coronavirus stimulus, as part of the Consolidated Appropriations Act, 2021
 Third coronavirus stimulus, as part of the American Rescue Plan Act of 2021

See also 
 Stimulus (economics)
 For government spending as stimulus, see fiscal policy
 For an increase in money designed to speed growth, see monetary policy